Windsor Park is a municipal park in St. Louis.

Geography
Windsor Park is located in the St. Louis neighborhood of Hyde Park.

Surrounding area
The park is bordered by Angelica Street on the south, Blair Ave on the east, 20th Street on the west, and Penrose Avenue on the North.

See also
Parks in St. Louis, Missouri

External links

Parks in St. Louis
Culture of St. Louis
Tourist attractions in St. Louis
Protected areas established in 1947
1947 establishments in Missouri